The tournaments for the qualification for the 2024 Women's European Water Polo Championship will be held between 10 March and 25 June 2023. The teams will play in two rounds to determine the eight qualified teams for the final tournament.

Round 1
Teams that did not participate in the last tournament, will enter in this round.

Round 2
Teams ranked sixth to twelvth in the last tournament enter in this round.

Qualified teams

See also
2024 Men's European Water Polo Championship Qualifiers

References

2024 European Water Polo Championship